Café Amazon is a chain of Thai coffeehouses owned by PTT Public Company Limited. The cafes are primarily found inside of malls, in city centres and petrol/gas stations.

There are more than 3,333 Café Amazon stores located around the world, making it the sixth largest coffee chain by number of outlets worldwide.

In April 2019, Café Amazon opened its first international flagship store in Jewel Changi Airport.

References 

 Quoted in

External links

 

Coffee brands
Coffeehouses and cafés
Restaurant chains in Thailand
Thai brands
PTT group